The Roman Catholic Diocese of Cristalândia is a diocese in the Ecclesiastical province of Palmas in central Brazil.

Its episcopal cathedral is  the Marian Catedral Prelatícia Nossa Senhora do Perpétuo Socorro, dedicated to Our Lady of Perpetual Support, in the city of Cristalândia in the Amazonian state of Tocantins.

History 
 Established on 26 March 1956 as Territorial Prelature of Cristalândia, on territories split off from the Territorial Prelature of São José de Alto Tocantins and the (suppressed) Territorial Prelature of Bananal 
 It lost territories twice to daughter jurisdictions : on 1969.05.13 to establish Territorial Prelature of São Félix (in the Ecclesiastical Province of Cuiaba), and on 1976.03.27 to establish Territorial Prelature of Santíssima Conceição do Araguaia (now a sister diocese in Palmas province).
 On 10 July 2019 was elevated in the rank of diocese and its territory was modified along with the territory of the neighbouring Roman Catholic Diocese of Miracema do Tocantins.

Statistics 
As per 2015, it pastorally served 176,700 Catholics (80.0% of 221,000 total) on 62,691 km² in 17 parishes and 80 missions with 20 priests (16 diocesan, 4 religious), 1 deacon, 25 lay religious (5 brothers, 20 sisters) and 2 seminarians.

As per 10 July 2019, in time of modification, it pastorally served 138,750 Catholics (56.6% of 245,020 total) on 62,691 km² in 17 parishes and 80 missions with 19 priests (17 diocesan, 2 religious), no deacons, 25 lay religious (2 brothers, 23 sisters) and 10 seminarians.

Episcopal Ordinaries 
(all Roman rite; initially members of missionary Latin congregations)

Bishop-Prelates of Cristalândia 
 Jaime Antônio Schuck, O.F.M. (born USA) (1958.11.25 – retired 1988.05.11), initially Titular Bishop of Avissa (1958.11.25 – 1978.05.26), died 1993
 Olívio Teodoro Obalhe, O.F.M. (first native incumbent) (1988.05.11 – died 1989.09.29), previously Coadjutor Bishop-Prelate of Cristalândia (1987.03.12 – 1988.05.11)
 Heriberto Hermes, O.S.B. (born USA) (1990.06.20 – retired 2009.02.25), died 2018
 Rodolfo Luís Weber (2009.02.25 – 2015.12.02); next Metropolitan Archbishop of Passo Fundo (Brazil) (2015.12.02 – ...)
 Wellington de Queiroz Vieira (2016.11.16 - 2019.07.10), no previous prelature.Diocesan Bishops of Cristalândia'' 
 Wellington de Queiroz Vieira (2019.07.10 - present).

See also 
 List of Catholic dioceses in Brazil

Sources and References 
 GCatholic.org, data for all sections, with Google map and HQ picture
 Catholic Hierarchy
  Official website

Roman Catholic dioceses in Brazil
Roman Catholic Ecclesiastical Province of Palmas
Roman Catholic dioceses and prelatures established in the 20th century
Territorial prelatures
Christian organizations established in 1956